Corrine Claire Hall,  (born 20 February 1991) is an English cyclist from Mitcham, London. She represented Great Britain in the 2016 Rio Paralympics as a sighted pilot for British cycling Paralympian, Lora Fachie with whom she was paired in 2013.

2016 Summer Paralympics
On 11 September 2016, Hall and Fachie won a gold medal in Rio de Janeiro at the 2016 Summer Paralympics, in the Women's individual pursuit B.

Hall was appointed Member of the Order of the British Empire (MBE) in the 2017 New Year Honours and Officer of the Order of the British Empire (OBE) in the 2022 Birthday Honours for services to cycling.

References

1991 births
Living people
English female cyclists
Paralympic cyclists of Great Britain
Paralympic gold medalists for Great Britain
Paralympic bronze medalists for Great Britain
Cyclists at the 2016 Summer Paralympics
Medalists at the 2016 Summer Paralympics
Officers of the Order of the British Empire
Paralympic medalists in cycling
Cyclists at the 2020 Summer Paralympics